The Florida Fish and Wildlife Conservation Commission (FWC) is a Florida government agency founded in 1999 and headquartered in Tallahassee. It manages and regulates the state's fish and wildlife resources, and enforces related laws. Officers are managers, researchers, and support personnel, and  perform law enforcement in the course of their duties.

History 
In 1998, an amendment to the Florida Constitution approved the establishment of the FWC with a headquarters in Tallahassee, the state capital, on July 1, 1999. It resulted from a merger between three former offices, namely the Marine Fisheries Commission, Division of Marine Resources, the former Florida Marine Patrol, and the Division of Law Enforcement of the Florida Department of Environmental Protection, and all of the employees and commissioners of the former Florida Game and Freshwater Fish Commission.

The Florida Department of Environmental Protection  since then serves as the environmental regulatory agency for the state, enforcing environmental legislation regarding air and water quality, for example.

In 2004, the Florida Legislature approved to integrate parts of the Division of Wildlife, Division of Freshwater Fisheries, and the Florida Marine Research Institute to create the Fish and Wildlife Research Institute (FWRI) in St. Petersburg, Florida. It has over 600 employees.

, the FWC had over 2,000 full-time employees, and maintained the FWRI, five regional offices, and 73 field offices across the state.

Organizational units
As of 2013, the FWC had six divisions:
Fish and Wildlife Research Institute
Division of Hunting and Game Management
Division of Habitat and Species Conservation
Division of Freshwater Fisheries Management
Division of Marine Fisheries Management, which oversees the state's artificial reef program
Division of Law Enforcement

The FWC has 11 offices for administrative purposes: 
Office of the Executive Director
Office of Information Technology
Office of Conservation Planning Services
Office of Community Relations
Office of Public Access and Wildlife Viewing Services
Office of Policy and Accountability
Office of Finance and Budget
Office of Human Resources
Office of the Inspector General
Office of Licensing and Permitting
Legal Office
Legislative Affairs Office

Commissioners

The Florida Constitution authorizes the commission to enact rules and regulations regarding the state's fish and wildlife resources for their long-term well-being and the benefit of people. To do this, the seven Governor of Florida-appointed commissioners meet five times each year to hear staff reports, consider rule proposals, and conduct other business. Because stakeholder involvement is a crucial part of the process, the commission meets in different locations across the state, giving citizens the opportunity to address the commission about issues under consideration.

The seven commissioners of the FWC are appointed by the governor and confirmed by the Florida legislature for five-year terms. Typically, commissioners come from different geographical areas of the state  to ensure that the FWC adequately protects the entire state of Florida, but multiple commissioners from the same city or region are not unusual. Their constitutional duty is to exercise the "...regulatory and executive powers of the state with respect to wild animal life and freshwater aquatic life and shall also exercise regulatory and executive powers of the state with respect to marine life, except that all license fees and penalties for violating regulations shall be as provided by law." The Commissioners :

Bear management
In 2012, the FWC adopted a plan on how the Florida black bear should be managed over the next 10 years. It created bear management units based on seven geographically distinct bear subpopulations. In June 2015, the FWC approved "a limited bear hunt to take place beginning October 24, 2015, in four of the seven bear management units".

Wildlife management areas 
Wildlife management areas (WMAs) conserve nearly 6 million acres of Florida's natural habitat. The WMAs exist to protect fish and wildlife resources, and provide recreational opportunities such as hunting and wildlife-viewing.

The first wildlife management area, Fred C. Babcock/Cecil M. Webb WMA, was established in 1941 with Pittman-Robertson Act funds. Since that time, 45 lead properties (see below) have been added to this system. FWC also manages a number of other cooperative properties in conjunction with other agencies.

In 2017, the 75th anniversary of the WMA system was noted. Events were held statewide and included a kickoff event on January 21, 2017, at Fred C. Babcock/Cecil M. Webb WMA, several bioblitzes, and a final event at Tosohatchee WMA on December 2, 2017. #WMAzing was the tag created for the event and is still in use today.

Properties
  
Andrews Wildlife Management Area
Apalachee Wildlife Management Area
Apalachicola River Wildlife and Environmental Area
Aucilla Wildlife Management Area
Bell Ridge Longleaf Wildlife and Environmental Area
Big Bend Wildlife Management Area
Box-R Wildlife Management Area
Branan Field Wildlife and Environmental Area
Caravelle Ranch Wildlife Management Area
Chassahowitzka Wildlife Management Area
Chinsegut Wildlife and Environmental Area
Crooked Lake Wildlife and Environmental Area
Dinner Island Ranch Wildlife Management Area
DuPuis Management Area
Escribano Point Wildlife Management Area
Everglades and Francis S. Taylor Wildlife Management Area
Fisheating Creek Wildlife Management Area
Florida Keys Wildlife and Environmental Area
Fort White Wildlife and Environmental Area
Fred C. Babcock/ Cecil M. Webb Wildlife Management Area
Guana River Wildlife Management Area
Half Moon Wildlife Management Area
Herky Huffman/Bull Creek Wildlife Management Area
Hickey's Creek Wildlife and Environmental Area
Hilochee Wildlife Management Area
Holey Land Wildlife Management Area
J.W. Corbett Wildlife Management Area
Joe Budd Wildlife Management Area
John C. and Mariana Jones/Hungryland Wildlife and Environmental Area
L. Kirk Edwards Wildlife and Environmental Area
Lafayette Forest Wildlife and Environmental Area
Lake George Wildlife Management Area
Lake Wales Ridge Wildlife and Environmental Area
Little Gator Creek Wildlife and Environmental Area
Moody Branch Wildlife and Environmental Area
Okaloacoochee Slough Wildlife Management Area
Perry Oldenburg Wildlife and Environmental Area
Platt Branch Wildlife and Environmental Area
Rotenberger Wildlife Management Area
Salt Lake Wildlife Management Area
Spirit-of-the-Wild Wildlife Management Area
Split Oak Forest Wildlife and Environmental Area
Suwannee Ridge Wildlife and Environmental Area 
T.M. Goodwin Wildlife Management Area 
Tenoroc Fish Management Area
Three Lakes Wildlife Management Area
Tomoka Wildlife Management Area Union-Camp Tract
Tosohatchee Wildlife Management Area
Triple N Ranch Wildlife Management Area
Watermelon Pond Wildlife and Environmental Area

See also

 List of law enforcement agencies in Florida
 Florida state forests
 Florida state parks
 Florida water management districts
 List of State Fish and Wildlife Management Agencies in the U.S.

References

External links
MyFWC.com: official Florida Fish and Wildlife Conservation Commission website
Official FWC Hunting Regulations
Official FWC Freshwater Fishing Regulations
Official FWC Saltwater Fishing Regulations

Fish And Wildlife Conservation Commission
Fish And Wildlife Conservation Commission
Fish And Wildlife Conservation Commission
State wildlife and natural resource agencies of the United States
.
Fish conservation organizations
Wildlife conservation organizations
Environmental organizations established in 1999
1999 establishments in Florida
Maritime law enforcement agencies of the United States